Eupithecia bohatschi is a moth in the family Geometridae first described by Otto Staudinger in 1897. It is found in Tuva, Transbaikalia, the Russian Far East, Mongolia, northern China and Korea.

The wingspan is about 18 mm.

References

Moths described in 1897
bohatschi
Moths of Asia